The Lower Merion Library System (LMLS) is the public library system of the township of Lower Merion, in Pennsylvania.  It is among the largest public library systems in Pennsylvania.  While Lower Merion accounts for 7% of the population of Montgomery County, it accounts for 20% of its library circulation. The library is ranked in the top 2% of public libraries for circulation per capita.

History
There are six neighborhood branches throughout the township. The first branch to open was the Ardmore Free Library in 1899, and Belmont Hills being the newest, opening in 1935. The largest branch is the Ludington Library with almost 168,000 items in circulation. The smallest branch is Belmont Hills, with almost 17,000 items available. 
Lower Merion Library System's governing board is the Board of Directors, consisting of 14 members, some of whom serve ex-officio due to being commissioners on the Lower Merion Board of Commissioners.

The Lower Merion Library is one of the independent public library systems in Montgomery County. All cardholders can borrow and utilize library systems from any other library in the Montgomery County library system. In addition, cardholders can request access to Access Pennsylvania which allows for privileges at many other library systems throughout the Commonwealth, including the Free Library of Philadelphia in neighboring Philadelphia. Lower Merion Library System cardholders can also utilize Overdrive, Zinio and Hoopla for e-books, magazines and video-recordings. Approximately 85% of LMLS' funding comes from Lower Merion, with the remainder coming from the State and individual branch libraries funding efforts.

See also

References

External links

Education in Montgomery County, Pennsylvania
Public libraries in Pennsylvania
Lower Merion Township, Pennsylvania